Shady Lane is an unincorporated community in Brazil Township, Clay County, Indiana. It is part of the Terre Haute Metropolitan Statistical Area.

Shady Lane was named from its tree-lined streets.

Geography

References

Unincorporated communities in Clay County, Indiana
Unincorporated communities in Indiana
Terre Haute metropolitan area